Axes is the third album by English rock group Electrelane.

For the mostly instrumental album, Electrelane once again returned to Steve Albini's studio in Chicago.  In the first recording session for Axes, the band played through the entire album in one take. This reflected the band's desire to have listeners experience the band's live show. Emma Gaze explained the album was recorded "the way we rehearse and practise: we all stand in a circle and it is very relaxed. Our previous recording experiences have been with the bass in one room, the drums in a different room, the two guitarists in a different room and then the vocals are done afterwards. Obviously it works like that because that is how most bands do it. But we just wanted it to sound more live; there is a different kind of energy that comes from playing in the same room." Verity Susman said that "We see the record as a continuous piece of music, not a collection of songs. It also reflects the way we improvise, moving from one idea to the next without a clear break. It’s also how we play live." The album was released on 9 May 2005 to mixed, but generally positive reviews.

Track listing 
All songs written by Electrelane and Verity Susman, except where noted.

 "One, Two, Three, Lots" – 1:44
 "Bells" – 4:38
 "Two for Joy" – 5:58
 "If Not Now, When?" – 5:47
 "Eight Steps" – 5:01
 "Gone Darker" – 7:05
 "Atom's Tomb" – 2:08
 "Business or Otherwise" – 5:47
 "Those Pockets Are People" – 5:02
 "The Partisan" (Anna Marly, Hy Zaret) – 2:32
 "I Keep Losing Heart" – 3:41
 "Come Back" – 0:07
 "Suitcase" (Electrelane, Ros Murray) – 9:46

Personnel 
 Verity Susman – organ, guitar, piano, harmonium, saxophone, vocals, brass arrangement, choir arrangement
 Emma Gaze – drums
 Mia Clarke – guitar
 Ros Murray – banjo, bass, cello
 Amy Larsen – trumpet
 Dasun Sinder – French horn
 Chicago a cappella – vocals
 Steve Albini – engineer
 Steve Rooke – mastering

Release history

References 

2005 albums
Electrelane albums
Albums produced by Steve Albini
Too Pure albums